Roar-o-Saurus is a wooden roller coaster located at Story Land in Glen, New Hampshire, United States. The coaster was designed and built by American wooden coaster design firm The Gravity Group.

References

Roller coasters in New Hampshire